Por Las Huevas (By The Roe) is the second album by Peruvian rock ska band XDinero. The album was released in 2001.

It is the first album with Roni Carbajal on lead vocals.

Track listing 

 "Mamá no me quiero casar - 5:24  
 "Pérez" - 6:05 
 "Camino el sol" - 4:19
 "Olga"  - 6:22
 "Ella besa así"  - 9:28
 "Dame tu amor"-  7:24  
 "Blanco calendario"   - 5:33
 "Picelada"  -3:40
 "Photo vegetal" - 2:34
 "Lucho"  - 9:28
 "Que calor"-  7:24 
 "Corazón de lata" - 5:33
 "Pianos" - Bonus track -4:04
 "Abriré tu corazón" - Bonus track - 5:09

Video clips 
 Mamá no me quiero casar-[Mom did not want to marry]
 Ella besa así-[She kisses and]

Personnel

Band 
 Roni Carbajal - Vocals
 Crhis Little - Lead guitars 
 Erick Colque - Lead Bass 
 Arturo Cardenas - Keyboards
 Remo Calcina - Trumpet
 Miguel Lizarraga - saxophone
 Luis Cornejo - Trombone
 Anthony Ortega - Drums

2001 albums
XDinero albums